Manuel Bompard (born 30 March 1986) is a French politician who has been a member of the National Assembly since 2022.

Early life and education
Manuel Bompard was born on March 30, 1986 in Firminy, and grew up in the Drôme. His father is a computer scientist, then a farmer, his mother is a public servant in the housing sector. He graduated from ENSIMAG's engineering school in Grenoble. He is a doctor in mathematics in 2011, after having defended a thesis of applied mathematics in aeronautics at the University of Nice Sophia Antipolis. He works in a startup specialized in machine learning in Ramonville-Saint-Agne.

Political career

Manuel Bompard joined the Left Party at its creation in 2009. He became national secretary in 2010. In 2012, he became a member of the "events" team of the campaign of Jean-Luc Mélenchon for the presidential election.

In 2015, he was the candidate of the Left Party, in partnership with Dagmara Szlagor of EELV, in the 2015 Departmental elections in Haute-Garonne in the Canton of Toulouse-5, where they arrive in 3rd position.

In 2017, Manuel Bompard was the candidate in the legislative election in the 9th constituency of Haute-Garonne, for La France Insoumise. He was defeated in the second round by Sandrine Mörch of La République En Marche!.

In July 2018, he left the leadership of the Left Party in order to devote himself to his mission of spokesperson for the La France Insoumise and the European's campaign. During the 2019 European Parliament election, he is in second place on the La France Insoumise's list of candidates.

For the 2022 French legislative election, he was the NUPES candidate in Bouches-du-Rhône's 4th constituency replacing Jean-Luc Mélenchon.

His seat in the European Parliament was taken by Marina Mesure.

References

1986 births
Living people
People from Firminy
Politicians from Auvergne-Rhône-Alpes
MEPs for France 2019–2024
La France Insoumise MEPs
La France Insoumise politicians
Grenoble Institute of Technology alumni
Côte d'Azur University alumni
Candidates for the 2022 French legislative election
Members of Parliament for Bouches-du-Rhône